Liv till varje pris (lit. Life at All Costs) is a 2014 novel by Swedish author Kristina Sandberg. It won the August Prize in 2014.

References

2014 Swedish novels
Swedish-language novels
August Prize-winning works
Norstedts förlag books